The 1999–2000 season was Birmingham City Football Club's 97th in the Football League. They finished in fifth place in the Football League First Division, qualifying for the promotion play-offs, but lost the first leg of the semifinal 4–0 at home to Barnsley. Although they won the away leg, they were eliminated 5–2 on aggregate. Birmingham entered the 1999–2000 FA Cup at the third round and lost to Everton in the fourth, and after entering the League Cup in the first round and defeating Newcastle United in the third, lost to West Ham United in the fourth round.

Paul Furlong was top scorer with 11 goals, all scored in league competition.

Football League First Division

Match details

League table (part)

Results summary

Play-offs

FA Cup

League Cup

Transfers

In

 Brackets round club names indicate the player's contract with that club had expired before he joined Birmingham.

Out

 Brackets round a club denote the player joined that club after his Birmingham City contract expired.

Loan in

Loan out

Appearances and goals

Numbers in parentheses denote appearances as substitute.
Players with squad numbers struck through and marked  left the club during the playing season.
Players with names in italics and marked * were on loan from another club for the whole of their season with Birmingham.

See also
 List of Birmingham City F.C. seasons

References
General
 
 
 Source for match dates, league positions and results: 
 Source for lineups, appearances, goalscorers and attendances: Matthews (2010), Complete Record, pp. 434–35.
 Source for goal times: 
 Sources for transfers:
 
 
 Source for discipline: individual player pages linked from 

Specific

Birmingham City F.C. seasons
Birmingham City